Charity was a racehorse who won the 1841 Grand National at the second attempt, defeating ten rivals in a time of 13 minutes 25 seconds. William Vevers was the official trainer of Charity. The owner of the horse was William Craven, 2nd Earl of Craven.

Charity had previously taken part in the 1839 Grand National, falling at the wall, which was sited roughly where the water jump is situated on the modern course. The mare was remounted by her rider A Powell only to fall again before reaching the Becher's Brook for the second time.

National Hunt racehorses
Non-Thoroughbred racehorses
1830 racehorse births
Racehorses trained in the United Kingdom
Racehorses bred in the United Kingdom
Grand National winners